The Embassy of Chile in London is the diplomatic mission of Chile in the United Kingdom. The embassy was formerly located on Devonshire Street in Marylebone before moving to its current site in 2009.

Heads of mission

Ministers 

 1910 to 1924: Agustín Edwards Mac-Clure

Ambassadors 

 1929/1930 to 1933: Enrique Villegas
2006 to 2010: Rafael Moreno Rojas
2014 to 2018: Rolando Drago Rodríguez
2018 to 2022: David Gallagher Patrickson
2022 to present: Susana Herrera Quezada

Gallery

References

External links
Official site

Chile
Diplomatic missions of Chile
Chile–United Kingdom relations
Buildings and structures in the City of Westminster